Pandharpur (Pronunciation: [pəɳɖʱəɾpuːɾ]) is a well known pilgrimage town, on the banks of Candrabhagā River, near Solapur city in Solapur District, Maharashtra, India. Its administrative area is one of eleven tehsils in the District, and it is an electoral constituency of the state legislative assembly (vidhan sabha). The Vithoba temple attracts about a million Hindu pilgrims during the major yātrā (pilgrimage) in Ashadh (June–July).

A small temple of Śri Vitthal-Rukmini is also located, which is as old as the main Vitthal-Rukmini Mandir, in Isbavi area of Pandharpur known as Wakhari Va Korti Devalayas and also known as Visava Mandir. The Bhakti Saint, Chaitanya Mahaprabhu, is said to have spent a period of 7 days in city at the Vithobha Temple. It is said that the deity Vithoba has been worshipped by many saints of Maharashtra. Sant Dnyaneshwar, Sant Tukārām, Sant Nāmdev, Sant Eknāth, Sant Nivruttināth, Sant Muktābai, Sant Chokhāmel̥ā, Sant Savatā Māli, Sant Narhari Sonār, Sant Gorā Kumbhār, Sant Meerā Bai and Sant Gajānan Mahāraj are a few of those prominent saints.

History
The oldest mention of Pandharpur is from 516 CE from Rashtrakuta era copper plate inscription. Yadava Kings in 11th and 12 the century gave numerous donations to the temple as evident from the inscriptions.

In the era of Adilshahi, most of the town was destroyed by Afzal Khan to hurt the religious sentiment of Shivaji Maharaja. Saints from all across Maharashtra still gathered here for annual pilgrimage and thus Pandharpur became the heart of the devotional movement which laid to the social-religious reform. This resulted in new social synthesis which later paved the foundation of Maratha Empire.

In the second half of the 18th century under the Marathas the temple and town was rebuilt under the Peshwas of Pune, Scindia of Gwailor and Holkar of Indore.

Mahadwar

Mahadwar is main locality in the city and a market place. Mahadwar leads to main ghāt of Pandharpur that is "Mahadwar ghat".There is temple of Bhakta Pundalika on the ghāt.

It is said that Shri Krishna came to Pandharpur to meet his disciple Bhakta Pundalīka who was busy serving his parents that time .He offered brick called viṭ in maraṭhi to Sri Krishna and requested him to wait standing on the brick for sometime till he attends his parents. The same Sri Krishna is standing on the brick for last 28 yuga and thus is also knows as Vitthala. So in ārati of vitthal it is mentioned "yuge atṭhāvis (28), viṭhevari ubhā".

Pauranic Significance of Pandharpur
There are other many ancient scriptures which elaborate the importance of Lord Vitthal.

Chandogya Upanishad : The fourth chapter of the Chandogya Upanishad, has one of the source of the ancient tradition of Shri Vitthala's worship. It contains the story of King Janśhruti who mentions about his visit to Pandharpur when he was on the way to search for Raikva.  He remarks that " He arrived at the location where the god "Vitthal," who is simply a reincarnation of Vishnu, was located on the bank of the river Bhimā. The name of this pilgrimage is Bindutirth, and the name of the local deity is Bindumādhav. There the God who gives the blessings of material and spiritual prosperity still lives."

Padma Puran : The meaning of God Pāndurang or Viṭhal is explained in Varāha samhitā of Padma Puran. Devrishi Nārada narrates to Lord Ādiśeṣa about arrival of  Pānduranga in Pandharpur, It explains the background and significance of Lord Vitthal's brick-standing at Pandharpur and origin of the Bhima River. Additionally, it provides information on Pandharpur's different gods and deities. Neera Narasinḥpur is as holy as Prayāga , Korti or Vishnupad is as holy as Gayā, and Pandharpur is as holy as Kāśī. Therefore, a trip to Pandharpur could result in the blessings of the pilgrimage to these three locations. This is where Gaya śhraddha and Kāshi yātra rituals can be carried out.

Skanda Purāṇ : Lord Shiva narrates to Mother Pārvati, "This place is spiritually fruitful three times more than Puṣhkara , six times more than Kedārnāth, ten times more than Vārānasi and many more times than Śriśaila. Performing Yātra, Vāri, and Dān have great merit at this place. 

There are four gates on the outside and inside of this building. Only via these gates may a person enter a city and they must bend their heads to the deity of these revered gates. Goddess Sarasvati is to the east, Siddheshvar of Machanoor is to the south, Bhuvaneshvar is to the west, and Mahiśhāsūrmardini is to the north at the internal gate. To the east of the exterior gates are Trivikarms of Ter, Koteshvar of Krishnatir Shorpalaya Kśhetra, Mahālakśhmī of Kolhāpur and Narsinḥa of Neera narasinhapur.

Mahāviṣnu, the supreme Lord Yogishvara, lives here with His nine celestial attributes. Vimalā, Uttkarshani, Dyan, Kriyā, Yoga, Pavi, Satyā, Eshana, and Anugraha are the names of those nine powers. Garuḍh (the eagle) stands in front of the Pānduranga statue, with Brahmā and Sanakadika to its right and the eleven Rudras and Lord Shankara to its left. All of the gods, including Indra, are applauding Lord Pāndurang from behind the idol.

This ancient text goes into detail about the importance and advantages of various temple rituals, including taking refuge in the temple's shadow, performing Pānduranga darshan, praising Panduranga in front of him, dancing in the rangshala, visiting the temple for darshan during dhupārti, cleaning the temple grounds, etc.The text clarifies the significance of the Pandharpur shrines Kundal Tirtha and Padma Tirtha.

Balarāma also arrived and served the Lord, along with Dhaumya Rishi and Yudhiṣhṭhira and all of his brothers. In Pandharpur, Rukmini served the Lord and gave birth to Pradyumna. The effects of the river Bhima's entry into Pandhari, Pandhari's protector Shri Bhairava, the devotee Muktakeshi's meditation, and her acceptance by God are all detailed in this scripture.

Demographics
According to the 2011 census of India, Pandharpur had a population of 98,000. Males constituted 52% of the population and females, 48%. 71% of the population was literate; 78% males and 64% females.

Marathi is the official and main language of people.

It is a major holy place in Maharashtra and it is also called South Kashi (Dakshin Kashi) in Maharashtra. It is famous for the Lord Vitthal temple situated on the bank of Bhima river. Bhima river is also known as Chandrabhaga as it takes shape like crescent moon near the town.  There are 4 yatra's (wari- gathering of pilgrims/devotees) per year, Chaitri, Ashadhi, Kartiki and Maghi, of which Ashadhi and Kartiki are the main yatra's. Devotees comes from all over Maharashtra, Karnataka and some part of Tamil Nadu They usually come walking hundred of miles, all the way from their hometown.

Connectivity

By Road
Pandharpur is 76 km from Solapur, 136 km from Sangli, 210 km from Pune and 360 km from Mumbai. 
Pandharpur possess good connectivity with rest of Maharashtra, Karnataka and Telangana by road. MSRTC bus station is located in the central part of city and at just 1 km distance from Shri Vitthal-Rukmini Temple. Direct services to almost all parts of Maharashtra are available with highest frequency to the cities of Solapur, Sangli and Pune. When it comes to other states, daily buses are available to different parts of Karnataka(mostly north Karnataka) and Hyderabad. Apart from this many private bus services operate daily between Pandharpur to Pune and Pandharpur to Sangli.

By Train
Pandharpur railway station has daily trains to nearest Kurduwadi and Miraj junction. Miraj-Kurduwadi train is daily popular train. Kolhapur-Nagpur express is available twice a week on Monday and Friday. Recently direct train from Sangli railway station to Pandharpur is also available daily night which is Sangli-Miraj-Parli Vaijnath express. Every Friday there is a train to Yeshwantpur(Bangalore).  The best option is nearest Solapur junction (75 km) which possess great connectivity to both north and south India. Many travellers also prefer to get down at Sangli railway station which is 136 km from Pandharpur and take a private car or bus from Sangli to Pandharpur.

By Air
Nearest International airport is at Pune (210 km) and Kolhapur airport is (180 km) .

References

External links
 PANDHARPUR by Gazetteer's Dept

Cities and towns in Solapur district
Hindu holy cities
Hinduism in Maharashtra
Talukas in Maharashtra